Latvia first participated at the Olympic Games in 1924. After the nation was occupied by the Soviet Union in 1940, Latvian athletes competed for the Soviet Union at the Olympics between 1952 and 1988. After the independence of Latvia and the dissolution of the Soviet Union in 1991, the nation returned to the Olympic Games in 1992 and has competed at every Games since then.

Latvian athletes have won a total of 21 medals at the Summer Olympic Games and 9 medals at the Winter Olympic Games. They have won a remarkably high proportion of silver medals, with 5 gold medals. These totals do not include medals won by Latvian athletes while competing for the Soviet Union.

The National Olympic Committee for Latvia was first created in 1922.  The current NOC is the Latvian Olympic Committee, which was recognized by the International Olympic Committee in 1991.

Medal tables

Medals by Summer Games

Medals by Winter Games

Medals by summer sport

Medals by winter sport

Other 
 Latvian sports shooter Haralds Blaus won bronze in the 1912 Olympics as a member of the Russian Empire team.

List of medalists

Summer Olympics

Winter Olympics

List of gold medal winners

Notes
At the 2010 Winter Olympics, Haralds Silovs became the first athlete in Olympic history to participate in both short track (1500m) and long track (5000m) speed skating, and the first  to compete in two different disciplines on the same day.

See also
 List of flag bearers for Latvia at the Olympics
 :Category:Olympic competitors for Latvia
 Latvia at the Paralympics

References

External links
 
 
 
 Video: Latvia's return to Olympic competition after lengthy Soviet occupation. February 12, 2020. Atslēgas. Public Broadcasting of Latvia. Retrieved March 1, 2020.